Fayez Al-Daihani (born 6 July 1962) is a Kuwaiti taekwondo practitioner. He competed in the men's featherweight at the 1988 Summer Olympics.

References

External links
 

1962 births
Living people
Place of birth missing (living people)
Kuwaiti male taekwondo practitioners
Olympic taekwondo practitioners of Kuwait
Taekwondo practitioners at the 1988 Summer Olympics